Joseph Ashby-Sterry (1836 or 1838 – 1 June 1917) was an English poet, novelist and journalist born in London. He contributed to Punch.

Life
Ashby-Sterry was born in London, as the only son of Henry Sterry of Sydenham Hill. His works include Boudoir Ballads, a collection of poetry. He did not marry. He died on 1 June 1917, leaving £12,039.

Journalism
Ashby-Sterry was a contributor to the British magazine Punch. He also wrote the "Bystander" column in a British weekly paper, The Graphic, for 18 years.

Select bibliography
Katharine and Petruchio, or, The Shaming of the True. London, S. Rivers, 1870
The Shuttlecock Papers : a book for an idle hour. London, Tinsley Bros., 1873
Tiny Travels. London, Tinsley, 1874
Boudoir Ballads. London, Chatto and Windus, 1876
The Wooden Midshipman. London, 1881
A Snailway Guide to Tunbridge Wells. Tunbridge Wells, R. Clements, 1884
The Lazy Minstrel. London, T. Fisher Unwin, 1886
Cucumber Chronicles; a book to be taken in slices. London, Sampson Low & Co., 1887
Charles Dickens in Southwark. London, 1888
Nutshell Novels. London, Hutchinson & Co., 1891
A Naughty Girl; a story of 1893. London, Bliss, Sands & Foster, 1893
A Tale of the Thames, etc. London, Bliss Sands, 1896
The Bystander; or Leaves for the Lazy. London, Sands & Co., 1901
The River Rhymer. London, W.J. Ham-Smith, 1913

References

Sources
Moruzi, Kristina (2016). Constructing Girlhood through the Periodical Press, 1850-1915. Accessed 15 July 2020. London: Routledge,

External links

Pen and ink portrait by Harry Furniss, at the National Portrait Gallery, London

English male poets
19th-century English novelists
20th-century English novelists
1836 births
1917 deaths
English male novelists
19th-century English male writers
20th-century English male writers